Louis Edmé Jean Baptiste Vinçard, called Vinçard aîné or Jules Vinçard,  born 12 thermidor an IV (30 July 1796) in Paris, died after 1878, was an artisan manufacturer of linear measurements, chansonnier, goguettier, follower and propagandist of Saint-Simonianism. He was editor of the newspaper La Ruche populaire. He lived in Saint-Maur-des-Fossés (Seine) for some time.

The writer and journalist , with whom he is sometimes mistaken, was his nephew.

He was also a very active goguettier and participated in particular to the activities of the goguettes Lice chansonnière, l'Enfer and le Lycée.

References

Sources 
 Jules Vinçard Mémoires épisodiques d'un vieux chansonnier saint-simonien E. Dentu éditeur, Paris 1878.

External links 
 Jules Vinçard on data.bnf.fr

French chansonniers
Saint-Simonists
1796 births
Businesspeople from Paris
Year of death missing